Elisha Lawrence (1740 - 1811) was a political figure in New Jersey and Nova Scotia. He represented King's County in the Nova Scotia House of Assembly from 1785 to 1793.

He was born in Monmouth County, New Jersey, the son of John Lawrence. He was the county sheriff at the start of the American Revolution. In 1775, he married Mary Ashfield. Lawrence raised a unit of 500 loyalists which later became part of the 1st Battalion of the New Jersey Volunteers. In 1777 he was taken prisoner by General John Sullivan on Staten Island; at the end of the war, he retired at the rank of colonel and settled in the Parrsboro area. Lawrence later moved to England and died in Cardigan, Wales.

References

Further reading
 Eaton, Arthur WH The History of King's County (1910)

1811 deaths
Nova Scotia pre-Confederation MLAs
Year of birth unknown
People from Monmouth County, New Jersey
Loyalist military personnel of the American Revolutionary War
New Jersey sheriffs
1740 births
People from Kings County, Nova Scotia
People from Cardigan, Ceredigion
Loyalists in the American Revolution from New Jersey